Delintment Lake is an artificial lake about  northwest of Burns in the U.S. state of Oregon. Its name derives from that of homesteader F. S. De Lentiement, who in 1891 was granted ownership of a  tract that included the land where the lake now stands.

The lake originated as a series of beaver ponds along Delintment Creek, a tributary of Silver Creek in Harney County. In 1940, the United States Forest Service combined and enlarged the ponds, and in 1953 local interest groups made further changes to improve conditions for fishing and other recreation.

A Malheur National Forest campground with 29 campsites is adjacent to the lake. Activities include fishing, swimming, picnicking, and boating. Campground hosts are present during the summer.

See also 
 List of lakes in Oregon

References

External links

Lakes of Harney County, Oregon
1940 establishments in Oregon
Reservoirs in Oregon